Ch is a digraph in the Latin script. It is treated as a letter of its own in Chamorro, Old Spanish, Czech, Slovak, Igbo, Uzbek, Quechua, Guarani, Welsh, Cornish, Breton, Ukrainian Latynka and Belarusian Łacinka alphabets. Formerly ch was also considered a separate letter for collation purposes in Modern Spanish, Vietnamese, and sometimes in Polish; now the digraph ch in these languages continues to be used, but it is considered as a sequence of letters and sorted as such.

History 
The digraph was first used in Latin since the 2nd century B.C. to transliterate the sound of the Greek letter chi in words borrowed from that language. In classical times, Greeks pronounced this as an aspirated voiceless velar plosive . In post-classical Greek (Koine and Modern) this sound developed into a fricative .

Now the digraph ch is used for all the aforementioned sounds, as shown below. The Old French usage of ch was also a model of several other digraphs for palatals or postalveolars: lh (digraph), nh (digraph), sh (digraph).

Use by language

Balto-Slavic languages 
In Balto-Slavic languages that use the Latin alphabet instead of the Cyrillic alphabet, ch represents the voiceless velar fricative . Ch is used in the Lithuanian language to represent the "soft h" , in word choras [ˈxɔrɐs̪] "choir". This digraph is not considered a single letter in the Lithuanian alphabet. This digraph is used only in loanwords. "Ch" represents  in Upper Sorbian.

Czech 
In Czech, the letter ch is a digraph consisting of the sequence of Latin alphabet graphemes C and H, however it is a single phoneme (pronounced as a voiceless velar fricative ) and represents a single entity in Czech collation order, inserted between H and I. In capitalized form, Ch is used at the beginning of a sentence (Chechtal se. "He giggled."), while CH or Ch can be used for standalone letter in lists etc. and only fully capitalized CH is used when the letter is a part of an abbreviation (e.g. CHKO Beskydy) and in all-uppercase texts.

In the Czech alphabet, the digraph Ch is handled as a letter equal to other letters. In Czech dictionaries, indexes, and other alphabetical lists, it has its own section, following that of words (including names) beginning with H and preceding that of words that begin with I. Thus, the word chemie will not be found in the C section of a Czech dictionary, nor the name Chalupa in the C section of the phonebook.  The alphabetical order  h ch is observed also when the combination ch occurs in median or final position:  Praha precedes Prachatice, hod precedes hoch.

Polish 
Ch had been used in the Polish language to represent the "unvoiced h"  as it is pronounced in the Polish word chleb "bread", and the h to represent "voiced h",  where it is distinct, as it is pronounced in the Polish word hak "hook". Between World War I and World War II, the Polish intelligentsia used to emphasize the "voiced h" to aid themselves in proper spelling.

Slovak
In Slovak, ch represents , and more specifically  in voiced position. At the beginning of a sentence it is used in two different variants: CH or Ch. It can be followed by a consonant (chladný "cold"), a vowel (chémia "chemistry") or diphthong (chiazmus "chiasmus").

Only a few Slovak words treat CH as two separate letters, e.g., viachlasný (e.g. "multivocal" performance), from viac ("multi")  and hlas ("voice").

In the Slovak alphabet, it comes between H and I.

Celtic languages 
In Goidelic languages, ch represents the voiceless velar fricative . Examples: broad in chara  "friend" (lenited), loch  "lake, loch", boichte  "poorer"; slender in Chéadaoin  "Wednesday" (lenited), deich  "ten". 

In Welsh ch represents the voiceless uvular fricative . The digraph counts as a separate letter in the Welsh alphabet, positioned after c and before d; so, for example, chwilen 'beetle' comes after cymryd 'take' in Welsh dictionaries; similarly, Tachwedd 'November' comes after taclus 'tidy'.

Chamorro 
The Chamorro Language has three different dialects - the Guamanian dialect, the Northern Mariana Islands dialect, and the Rotanese dialect.  With the minor difference in dialect, the Guamanians have a different orthography from the other two dialects.  In Guamanian orthography, both letters tend to get capitalized (e.g.: CHamoru).  The Northern Mariana Islands' & Rotanese orthography enforces the standard capitalization rule (e.g.: Chamorro).

Germanic languages 
In several Germanic languages, including German and romanized Yiddish, ch represents the voiceless velar fricative .

Dutch 
Dutch ch was originally voiceless, while g was voiced. In the northern Netherlands, both ch and g are voiceless, while in the southern Netherlands and Flanders the voiceless/voiced distinction is upheld. The voiceless fricative is pronounced [x] or [χ] in the north and [ç] in the south, while the voiced fricative is pronounced [ɣ] in the north (i.e. the northern parts of the area that still has this distinction) and [ʝ] in the south. This difference of pronunciation is called 'hard and soft g'.

English 
When it represents  word-medially or word-finally, it usually follows a consonant (belch, lunch, torch, etc.) or two vowels (beach, speech, touch, etc.). Elsewhere, this sound is usually spelled tch, with a few exceptions (attach, sandwich, lychee, etc.).

Most words with this pronunciation of ch find their origin in Greek words with the letter chi, like mechanics,  chemistry and character. Others, like chiaroscuro, scherzo and zucchini, come from Italian.

In some English words of French origin, "ch" represents , as in charade, machine, chivalry and nonchalant. Due to hypercorrection, this pronunciation also occurs in a few loanwords from other sources, like machete (from Spanish) and pistachio (from Italian).

In certain dialects of British English ch is often pronounced  in two words: sandwich and spinach, and also in place names, such as Greenwich and Norwich.

The digraph can also be silent, as in Crichton, currach, drachm, yacht and traditionally in schism.

German 
In German, ch normally represents two allophones: the voiceless velar fricative  (or the voiceless uvular fricative ) following a, o or u (called Ach-Laut), and the voiceless palatal fricative  following any other vowel or a consonant (called Ich-Laut). A similar allophonic variation is thought to have existed in Old English.

The sequence "chs" is normally pronounced , as in sechs (six) and Fuchs (fox).

It is always pronounced  when followed by l or r, as in Chlor (chlorine) or Christus (Christ).

Swedish 
In Swedish, ch represents /ɧ/ and /ɕ/ in loanwords such as choklad and check. These sounds come from former [ʃ] and [tʃ], respectively. In the conjunction och (and), ch is pronounced [k] or silent.

Hungarian
The digraph ch is not considered part of the Hungarian alphabet, but it has historically been used for [tʃ], as in English and Spanish, and this use has been preserved in family names: Széchenyi, Madách. It is also retained in family names of German origin, where it is pronounced [h]: Aulich. The digraph is also used in some loan words, such as technika or jacht where it is pronounced [h].

Interlingua
In Interlingua, ch  is pronounced /ʃ/ in words of French origin (e.g. 'chef' = /ʃef/ meaning "chief" or "chef"), /k/ in words of Greek and Italian origin (e.g. "choro" = /koro/ meaning "chorus"), and more rarely /t͡ʃ/ in words of English or Spanish origin (e.g. "cochi" /kot͡ʃi/ meaning "car" or "coach"). Ch may be pronounced either /t͡ʃ/ or /ʃ/ depending on the speaker in many cases (e.g. "chocolate" may be pronounced either /t͡ʃokolate/ or /ʃokolate/).

Romance languages 
In Catalan ch represents final  sound. In the past it was widely used, but nowadays it is only present in some surnames (e.g.). In medieval Catalan it was occasionally used to represent  sound.

In native French words, ch represents  as in chanson (song). In most words of Greek origin, it represents  as in archéologie, chœur, chirographier; but chimie, chirurgie, and chimère have , as does anarchiste.

In Italian and Romanian, ch represents the voiceless velar plosive  before -e and -i.

Spanish 
Ch is pronounced as a voiceless postalveolar affricate  in both Castillian and American Spanish, or a voiceless postalveolar fricative  in Andalusian.

Ch is traditionally considered a distinct letter of the Spanish alphabet, called che. In the 2010 Orthography of the Spanish Language, Ch is no longer considered a letter of its own but rather a digraph consisting of two letters.

Until 1994 ch was treated as a single letter in Spanish collation order, inserted between C and D; in this way, mancha was after manco and before manda. However, an April 1994 vote in the 10th Congress of the Association of Spanish Language Academies adopted the standard international collation rules, so ch is now considered a sequence of two distinct characters, and dictionaries now place words starting with ch- between those starting with ce- and ci-, as there are no words that start with cf- or cg- in Spanish. Similarly, mancha now precedes manco in alphabetical order.

Other languages
In both systems, the digraph ch is considered a single letter.

In the Ossetic Latin alphabet, ch was used to write the sound [].

In Palauan, ch represents a glottal stop .

Ch represents [] in Uyghur Latin script.

Ch represents  in the Uzbek alphabet. It is considered a separate letter, and is the 28th letter of the alphabet.

In Vietnamese, ch represents the voiceless palatal plosive  in the initial position.

In Xhosa and Zulu, ch represents the voiceless aspirated velar dental click .

In Obolo, ch represents a []. It is considered a single letter since 'c' and 'h' do not exist independently in the Obolo alphabet.

Use in romanization 
"Ch" is frequently used in transliterating into many European languages from Greek, Hebrew, Yiddish, and various others.

In Mandarin Chinese ch is used in Pinyin to represent an aspirated voiceless retroflex affricate .

In Japanese, ch is used in Hepburn to represent the chi sound (ち). 

In Marathi an Indian language, ch is used to represent voiceless alveo-palatal affricate /tɕ/ and voiceless denti-alveolar affricate /ts/ in romanization from the Devanagari script 

In many transliterations of Hebrew and Yiddish, the ch digraph is used to represent the voiceless uvular fricative  /χ/, which is represented in Modern Hebrew by the letters ח and כ. Other transliterations systems will use the digraph kh to represent the same sound.

Alternate representations
International Morse code provides a unitary code for Ch used in several non-English languages, namely — — — —.

In the Czech extension to Braille the letter Ch is represented as the dot pattern ⠻.

In computing, Ch is represented as a sequence of C and H, not as a single character; only the historical KOI-8 ČS2 encoding contained Ch as a single character.

References

Latin-script digraphs